The 2020–21 II liga was the 73rd season of the third tier domestic division in the Polish football league system since its establishment in 1948 and the 13th season of the Polish II liga under its current title. The league was operated by the PZPN.

The league was contested by 19 teams. The regular season was played in a round-robin tournament. The season started on 28 August 2020 and concluded on 12 June 2021 (regular season). Each team played a total of 36 matches, half at home and half away. After the 18th matchday the league went on a winter break between 17 December 2020 and 26 February 2021. Due to the COVID-19 pandemic, the 120 matches have been played with a limited number of spectators. The rest of the matches (until 17 October 2020 and on 16 May 2021) were played behind closed doors without any spectators.

Changes from last season
The following teams have changed division since the 2019–20 season.

To II liga

From II liga

Team overview

Stadiums and locations

 Due to the renovation of Stadion Stal in Rzeszów, Stal have played four home games at Podkarpackie Centrum Piłki Nożnej in Stalowa Wola.

League table

Results

Promotion play-offs
II liga play-offs for the 2020–21 season were played on 15 and 19 June 2021. The teams who finished in 3rd, 4th, 5th and 6th place were set to compete. The fixtures were determined by final league position – 3rd team of regular season vs 6th team of regular season and 4th team of regular season vs 5th team of regular season. The winner of final match, Skra Częstochowa, won promotion to I liga for next season. All matches were played in a stadiums of team which occupied higher position in regular season.

Top goalscorers

See also
 2020–21 Ekstraklasa
 2020–21 I liga
 2020–21 III liga
 2020–21 Polish Cup
 2020 Polish SuperCup

Notes

References

External links
  

2020-21
2020–21 in Polish football
Poland